The 1910 Nebraska gubernatorial election was held on November 8, 1910.

Incumbent Democratic Governor Ashton C. Shallenberger was defeated in the Democratic primary.

Republican nominee Chester Hardy Aldrich defeated Democratic nominee James Dahlman with 51.90% of the vote.

Primary elections
Primary elections were held on August 16, 1910.

Democratic primary

Candidates
James Dahlman, Mayor of Omaha
Ashton C. Shallenberger, incumbent Governor

Results

People's Independent primary

Candidates
Ashton C. Shallenberger, incumbent Governor

Results

Shellenberger declined the nomination. The state central committee decided not to fill the vacancy.

Prohibition primary

Candidates
George I. Wright

Results

Wright withdrew from the candidacy in favour of Aldrich.

Republican primary

Candidates
Chester Hardy Aldrich, former State Senator
Addison E. Cady, Republican candidate for Nebraska's 6th congressional district in 1896
William Elmer Low, farmer

Results

Socialist primary

Candidates
Clyde J. Wright, state secretary of the Socialist Party

Results

General election

Candidates
Major party candidates
James Dahlman, Democratic
Chester Hardy Aldrich, Republican

Other candidates
Clyde J. Wright, Socialist

Results

References

Bibliography
 

1910
Nebraska
Gubernatorial